Fell Lapland is a subdivision of Finnish Lapland and one of the Sub-regions of Finland since 2009.

Municipalities
 Enontekiö
 Kittilä
 Kolari
 Muonio

Politics
Results of the 2018 Finnish presidential election:

 Sauli Niinistö   55.3%
 Paavo Väyrynen   17.4%
 Pekka Haavisto   9.5%
 Merja Kyllönen   7.4%
 Matti Vanhanen   6.1%
 Laura Huhtasaari   5.2%
 Tuula Haatainen   1.7%
 Nils Torvalds   0.3%

Sub-regions of Finland
Lapland (Finland)

References